Lukas Mondele (born 29 March 2004) is a Belgian professional footballer who plays as a midfielder for Belgian First Division B side Club NXT.

Club career
Mondele began his career at the youth academy of Club Brugge. On 22 January 2021, Mondele made his debut for Brugge's reserve side, Club NXT in the Belgian First Division B against Lierse.

Career statistics

Club

References

External links
 
Profile at the Club Brugge website

2004 births
Living people
Belgian footballers
Association football midfielders
Club NXT players
Challenger Pro League players
Belgium youth international footballers